Sun City Center is an unincorporated census-designated place (CDP) in southern Hillsborough County, Florida, United States. It is located south of Tampa and north of Sarasota on I-75. As of the 2020 census, the population was 30,952. The ZIP Code serving the community is 33573.

Description
Sun City Center is an age-restricted community, which consists of single-family dwellings, duplexes, townhouses, and apartment buildings. It has its own hospital and several nursing home facilities. It is legal to drive golf carts on the wide, palm-lined streets during daylight hours, and most shopping has special parking slots for same. There are about seven golf courses, various hobby shops, and an outdoor and two indoor pools in the main clubhouse area. There are clubs for almost any interest or hobby, including ham radio, computers, art, woodworking, photography, sewing, cards, investments, and dancing.

Geography
Sun City Center is located in southern Hillsborough County at  (27.713353, -82.359659). It is bordered to the northwest by Apollo Beach, to the northeast by Balm, to the east by Wimauma, and to the west by Ruskin. Interstate 75 forms the northwestern edge of the CDP, with access from Exit 240, Sun City Center Boulevard (State Road 674). U.S. Route 301 forms the eastern edge of the CDP, and the southern edge follows the Little Manatee River.

Demographics

As of the census of 2000, there were 16,321 people, 9,149 households, and 5,434 families residing in the community. The racial makeup of the community was 98.96% White, 0.13% African American, 0.08% Native American, 0.40% Asian, 0.07% Pacific Islander, 0.14% from other races, and 0.21% from two or more races. Hispanic or Latino of any race were 1.19% of the population.

There were 9,149 households, out of which 0.3% had children under the age of 18 living with them, 57.1% were married couples living together, 1.9% had a female householder with no husband present, and 40.6% were non-families. 38.1% of all households were made up of individuals, and 34.7% had someone living alone who was 65 years of age or older.  The average household size was 1.65 and the average family size was 2.05.

In the community the population was skewed toward the elderly with 0.4% under the age of 18, 0.2% from 18 to 24, 1.3% from 25 to 44, 15.1% from 45 to 64, and 83.0% who were 65 years of age or older.  The median age was 75 years. For every 100 females, there were 74.4 males.  For every 100 females age 18 and over, there were 74.2 males.

The median income for a household in the community was $38,101, and the median income for a family was $47,570. Males had a median income of $36,786 versus $27,963 for females. The per capita income for the community was $28,222.  About 2.2% of families and 4.6% of the population were below the poverty line, including 37.3% of those under age 18 and 3.9% of those age 65 or over.

Transportation
Sun City Center is served primarily by two Hillsborough Area Regional Transit bus lines:
Line 571 - South County Flex
Line 75LX - South County Shopper

Notable people
Bud Sagendorf, cartoonist of the Thimble Theater comic strip and the Popeye comic books

References

External links
 Official site
 Sun City Center Chamber of Commerce

Census-designated places in Hillsborough County, Florida
Retirement communities
Census-designated places in Florida
1961 establishments in Florida